The 2013 World Shotgun Championships were held in September 2013 in Lima, Peru. As in all odd-numbered years, separate ISSF World Shooting Championships were carried out in the trap, Double Trap and skeet events.

Competition schedule

Men

Women

Medal summary

Seniors

Juniors

References
Official schedule

ISSF World Shooting Championships
ISSF World Shotgun Championships
Shooting
2013 in Peruvian sport
2010s in Lima
Sports competitions in Lima
Shooting competitions in Peru
September 2013 sports events in South America